Ângela Mendonça Ribeiro (born 27 February 1962) is a Brazilian diver. She competed at the 1984 Summer Olympics and the 1988 Summer Olympics.

References

External links
 

1962 births
Living people
Brazilian female divers
Olympic divers of Brazil
Divers at the 1984 Summer Olympics
Divers at the 1988 Summer Olympics
Divers from São Paulo
20th-century Brazilian women